Boryana Glacier is the 11 km long and 3.2 km wide glacier on Nordenskjöld Coast in Graham Land, Antarctica situated west-southwest of Desudava Glacier and northeast of Darvari Glacier.  It is draining the southeast slopes of Detroit Plateau, flowing between Rice Bastion and Gusla Peak, then turning southwards to enter Mundraga Bay between Desudava Glacier and Darvari Glacier.

The feature is named after the settlement of Boryana in northeastern Bulgaria.

Location
British mapping in 1978.

See also
 List of glaciers in the Antarctic
 Glaciology

Maps
 Antarctic Digital Database (ADD). Scale 1:250000 topographic map of Antarctica. Scientific Committee on Antarctic Research (SCAR). Since 1993, regularly upgraded and updated.

References
 Boryana Glacier SCAR Composite Antarctic Gazetteer
 Bulgarian Antarctic Gazetteer Antarctic Place-names Commission (Bulgarian)
 Basic data (English)

External links
 Boryana Glacier. Copernix satellite image

Bulgaria and the Antarctic
Glaciers of Nordenskjöld Coast